Albert Edward Munn (30 January 1865 – 22 February 1946) was a Canadian businessman and politician. Munn was a Liberal party member of the House of Commons of Canada. He was born in Trafalgar Township, Canada West becoming a lumber merchant and manager.

Munn attended school at Otterville, Ontario. He became a councillor for the city of Orillia, Ontario for two years.

He moved to British Columbia and entered provincial politics there, becoming a Liberal member of the legislature at the Lillooet riding in the 1924 provincial election. He was defeated by Ernest Crawford Carson in the 1928 provincial election.

He was first elected to Parliament at the Vancouver North riding in the 1930 general election. After serving only one term, the 17th Canadian Parliament, he was defeated by Charles Grant MacNeil of the Co-operative Commonwealth Federation in the 1935 election.

References

External links
 

1865 births
1946 deaths
British Columbia Liberal Party MLAs
Liberal Party of Canada MPs
Members of the House of Commons of Canada from British Columbia
Ontario municipal councillors
People from the Regional Municipality of Halton
People from Orillia